Nu-Mixx Klazzics is a remix album by American rapper 2Pac, released in 2003 under Death Row Records and Koch Records. The album includes several songs from All Eyez on Me and The Don Killuminati: The 7 Day Theory, with remixed instrumentals and new guest vocals from artists such as Crooked I (replacing Snoop Dogg on the "2 of Amerikaz Most Wanted" remix), Aaron Hall, K-Ci & JoJo, and Danny Boy. Nu-Mixx Klazzics was generally disliked by critics upon its release. The remixes were criticized for being another Death Row 'cash in' featuring low quality versions of the original tracks. No singles or videos were released from the project. It sold 700,000 copies.

Track listing 

Note: All songs remixed otherwise stated.

Personnel 
 Tupac Shakur – main performer
 Suge Knight – executive producer
 Carl "Butch" Small – percussion, production Director
 Danny "O.M.B." Devoux – bass, guitar
 Ken Nahoum – photography
 Tom Daugherty – engineer, mixing engineer, mixing
 Mike Bozzi – mastering
 Tracy Hardin – vocals, vocals (background)
 Matt "Party Man" Woodlief – assistant engineer
 Darren Vegas – drums, sequencing, keyboards
 Tha Row Hitters – producer, mixing
 Josh "Kash" Andrews – drums, keyboards, sequencing
 Soren Baker – liner notes
 Michael Blade – flute
 Brian Gardner – mastering

Charts

References 

Remix albums published posthumously
2003 remix albums
Tupac Shakur remix albums
Death Row Records remix albums
Gangsta rap remix albums